The art pipeline is the process of creating and implementing art for a particular project, most commonly associated with the creative process for developing video games. In an era of high-profile video games, wherein the creative energy of the teams and the budgets for projects surpass even some Hollywood blockbusters, graphics are ever-improving and an increasingly important selling point. Video Game developers employ extensive teams of artists to carry a project's artistic goals through from the conceptual stage to the final release. A fully realized game asset, whether it is a character, background, building, object, or animation, is created in a deliberate process with different artists working on and contributing separate aspects in a step by step process to the final product. To facilitate this process, a number of software programs are marketed to developers as flexible tools for productively streamlining the transformation of elements created within a program to a fully realized game asset. These highly customizable programs allow users to apply plug-ins or add-ons to tailor the interactions each program will have with one another as an element moves along the pipeline from concept to completion.

Art pipeline is basically the “production line” of video game development. It is used to describe the streamlined  process of development and production. It is broken down into four major categories, each with their own very specific set of steps.

The phases are concept, design, pre-production, and post production.

Concept is the basic idea of the game to be made, be it an original game or an addition to a pre-existing franchise. This is where developers do the brainstorming. This is also the point where an idea of varying levels of completeness can be pitched to the game developers in question.

Design is the stage where the look, flow, story, etc. is created. storyline, story boards, dialogue, character design, plot, and the like. This is where a coherent game is created. Characters are designed, developed, and completed, storyline is dictated with a distinct plot flow and (where the game warrants such treatment) CG Cut away scenes are conceptualized for the forward momentum of the game’s story. Here is where the game’s overall appearance is dictated, such as how will the levels look, what kind of environment are we building, etc. Costumes, equipment, game play, major level goals, etc. are all decided here. In essence, this is where the “meat” of the game is put together.

Pre-production is the actual building of the game.  Artists, programmers, technicians, producers, and directors are all involved in this stage. This is the stage that has brought rise to the new designation of “technical artists.” Artists and programmers work closely together to make sure the vision comes fully to life. Deviations from the original conceptualization are common here as the technical and artistic goals are found ineffective, or impossible. This is where the actual games take shape  This is where the “alpha” copy is made. During this stage the developers work closely with marketing specialists so they can start building an advertising campaign.

Post-production is the initial testing of the game wherein game testers are paid to play through the alpha and spot obvious problem areas and game glitches. The details are ironed out here and 3rd party critiques are taken into account. They find what needs fixing, report the bugs, and then the designers and producers fix them. When the initial testing and correcting is done, we get the beta copy. This is the copy that often is produced in small quantities for specially selected, non-industry individuals can play through and further investigate glitches and bugs, as well as giving the producers an idea of the overall effectiveness of the game. After all this is done we finally get the final, shippable copy that makes its way to stores for the enjoyment of the masses.

References

External links
 Simple Animation Pipeline

Animation techniques